Robert Thomson (ca. 1807 – 15 November 1863) was an Australian politician. He was the member for Eastern Province of the Victorian Legislative Council from 1 November 1856 to 1 November 1863.

Thomson's parents were Rev. William Thomson and his wife Janet (née Thompson). He was born in Scotland and emigrated to New South Wales in 1834, moving to Victoria in 1841. He married Margaret Louisa Campbell and they had five sons and two daughters.

References

1807 births
1863 deaths
Members of the Victorian Legislative Council
19th-century Australian politicians